Nikolay Tihomirov Barekov (born 16 October 1972) is a Bulgarian journalist, politician, and businessman. Since January 2014 he has been the leader of the political party Bulgaria Without Censorship.

Biography 
Barekov majored in Bulgarian philology, specializing in TV journalism. His career as a radio journalist began in 1992, when he joined the "Kanal Kom" (Bulgarian: "Канал Ком") radio in Plovdiv.
 
Between 2003 and 2010, Barekov presented the morning segment on the BTV channel. He subsequently hosted a number of shows on TV7.

On 25 January 2014, Barekov founded the Bulgaria without Censorship political party and the new political establishment participated in the 2014 European elections as part of a coalition bloc with the nationalist IMRO and other smaller parties, earning two seats in the European Parliament and became members of the eurosceptic group of European Conservatives and Reformists. He is consistently ranked as an MEP with one of the lowest attendance rates in roll-call votes. He refused to give a reason for his absence when asked by Euronews.

Barekov supports the restoration of the monarchy with Simeon Saxe-Coburg-Gotha as Tsar of Bulgaria.

References 

1972 births
Living people
Writers from Plovdiv
Politicians from Plovdiv
Bulgarian journalists
Bulgarian conservatives
Bulgarian monarchists
MEPs for Bulgaria 2014–2019
Bulgaria Without Censorship MEPs